Oppenheim is a German surname. Notable people with the surname include:

 A. Leo Oppenheim (1904–1974), Assyriologist
 Alan V. Oppenheim (born 1937), professor of Electrical Engineering at MIT and author
 Alexander Oppenheim (1903–1997), British mathematician and university administrator
 Alfred Freiherr von Oppenheim (1934–2005), associate of Sal. Oppenheim bank
 Alfred Oppenheim (chemist) (1878–1943), German chemist and manufacturer
 Avrohom Chaim Oppenheim (1796?–1824?), Rabbi at Péczel, Hungary
 Berthold Oppenheim (1867–1942), Moravian rabbi
 David Ernst Oppenheim (1881–1943), Austrian educator
 David Oppenheim (clarinetist) (1922–2007), American clarinetist and classical music and television producer
 David Oppenheim (poker player), American professional poker player
 David Oppenheim (rabbi) (1664–1736), chief rabbi of Prague
 Dennis Oppenheim (1938–2011), American conceptual artist, performance artist, sculptor, and photographer  
 E. Phillips Oppenheim (1866–1946), English novelist  
 Franz Oppenheim (1852-1929), German chemist, entrepreneur and industrialist
 Heinrich Bernhard Oppenheim (1819–1880), German jurist, politician, and philosopher
 Hermann Oppenheim (1858–1919), German neurologist
 James Oppenheim (1882–1932), American poet, author, and editor
 Jeanette Oppenheim (born 1952), Danish lawyer and politician, MEP
 Jill Arlyn Oppenheim (born 1940), American actress better known as Jill St. John
 Joachim Oppenheim (1832–1891), rabbi and author
 Jonathan Oppenheim, British scientist
 Jonathan Oppenheim (film editor) (1951–2020), American film editor
 L. F. L. Oppenheim (1858–1919), German jurist
 Max von Oppenheim (1860–1946), German diplomat and archaeologist
 Meret Oppenheim (1913–1985), Swiss artist and lyricist
 Moritz Daniel Oppenheim (1800–1882), German painter
 Noah Oppenheim (born 1980), American writer, television producer, and President of NBC News
 Rob Oppenheim (born 1980), American professional golfer
 Sally Oppenheim (born 1930), shortened name for Sally Oppenheim-Barnes, Baroness Oppenheim-Barnes, former UK member of Parliament
 Salomon Oppenheim, Jr. (1772–1828), founder of the Sal. Oppenheim bank
 Samuel Oppenheim (1857–1928), Austrian astronomer

See also
 Oppenheim family, prominent European banking family since the 18th century
 Oppenheimer

German-language surnames
Jewish surnames